Camellia petelotii is a species of plant in the family Theaceae. It is found in China (endemic in the Guangxi Zhuang Autonomous Region in southern China) and Vietnam.  It may be called the golden camellia and synonyms include C. chrysantha and Camellia nitidissima. The golden camellia originated 170 million years ago, it is a first-class nationally protected plant in China.  The golden camellia is extremely demanding on the growth environment, and its genes are extremely difficult to replicate, once transplanted, it will die or genetically mutate. Therefore, in 1986, the Golden Camellia National Nature Reserve was built in Fangcheng, Guangxi, with a total area of 9195.1 hectares.

It is threatened by habitat loss. It originates from southern China and Vietnam where it has been used to make tea; it has also been propagated as a garden plant for its waxy yellow flowers, which are unusual in a camellia. It is endangered in the wild, but favored as a garden plant.

Description 
Camellia petelotii is a shrub or small tree growing up to 5 meters in height.

Uses 
According to the research and experiments of The Institute of Medicinal Plant Development (China)-Guangxi Branch and some other Chinese medicine research institutions in Guangxi, Golden camellia tea has the functions of preventing cancer, inhibiting tumor growth, lowering blood pressure, lowering blood lipids, lowering cholesterol, preventing atherosclerosis, delaying aging and other health effects as improve the body's immune.

Gallery

References

Further reading
 Sunyatsenia 7: 19 1948.
 The Plant List
 International Camellia Society
 Global Trees Campaign

External links
 
 

petelotii
Vulnerable plants
Taxonomy articles created by Polbot